"Desdemona" is a song recorded in 1971 by The Searchers. It was their final charting single and their first in the U.S. following an almost five-year hiatus.

The song was the first of two singles from their Second Take LP, and the only one to chart.  The B-side was a non-album track. It was written by the songwriting team of Valerie Murtagh and Harold Spiro.

"Desdemona" reached No. 94 on the U.S. Billboard Hot 100 and No. 79 on Cash Box.  It did not chart outside the United States.

Chart history

References

External links
 Lyrics of this song
 

1971 songs
1971 singles
The Searchers (band) songs
RCA Victor singles
Songs written by Harold Spiro
Songs written by Valerie Murtagh